The Deutsche Barockgalerie is an art gallery housed in the Schaezlerpalais in Augsburg. It was set up in 1958 and displays works from the Baroque period from the city's collection (the Städtische Kunstsammlungen Augsburg) and from private lenders.  The magnificent and extensive collection on display includes works by Caravaggio, Dürer, Holbein, Tiepolo and Cranach.

External links

Landesstelle für die nichtstaatlichen Museen in Bayern

Art museums and galleries in Germany
Baroque painting
Art museums established in 1958
1958 establishments in West Germany
Museums in Bavaria
Augsburg